The Legion of Doom is a group of supervillains who originated in Challenge of the Super Friends, an animated series from Hanna-Barbera based on DC Comics' Justice League. The Legion of Doom has since been incorporated into the main DC Universe, appearing in comics, as well as further animated and live-action adaptations, and also video games.

History
In each episode of Challenge of the Super Friends that they appeared, the Legion of Doom would enact a plot against the Super Friends and a plot to take over the world only to be met with defeat by the end of the story. In some episodes, they would escape capture through a last-minute escape plan often contrived by Luthor. Other times, the Legion of Doom (or portions of it) would end up apprehended.

The episode "History of Doom" showed that Lex Luthor assembled 12 supervillains in order to form the most powerful and sinister group the world had ever seen.

Development
When the Challenge of the Super Friends season was originally conceived, it was named Battle of the Superheroes and featured the introduction of Captain Marvel to the Super Friends. The group that challenged the heroes was to be called the "League of Evil", led by Captain Marvel's nemesis Doctor Sivana. However, Filmation was producing Shazam! and The New Adventures of Batman which prevented the use of characters such as Mister Atom, King Kull, Beautia Sivana, Joker, Penguin, Mr. Freeze, and Catwoman. Early conceptual art drawn by Alex Toth also included Heat Wave, Poison Ivy, and Abra Kadabra.

The Hall of Doom
The Legion of Doom's headquarters was the Hall of Doom that was located in Slaughter Swamp (just outside Gotham City). The facility, which has a close resemblance to Darth Vader's helmet, could be lowered or raised above the swamp water's surface. It could fly or enter space using rockets. The Hall of Doom's mobility could be controlled through remote control helping the Legion to escape on several occasions. Its defenses included laser weapons and the ability to time travel.

In "Doomsday" after Sinestro, Black Manta and Cheetah are abandoned by the rest of the Legion after they take control of a mental device, they use it to create another Hall of Doom, which attacks the original one and enables the Legion to be captured.

In "History of Doom", the Hall is shown being constructed in a barn just after the Legion formed. Black Manta proposed that they have it in the ocean, Captain Cold proposes to have underneath the polar ice caps, and Gorilla Grodd proposes that they have it in the jungle. As a compromise, Lex Luthor decides to have it within the waters of Slaughter Swamp as it is then flown to that location.

Members
There were thirteen members of the Legion of Doom:

 Despite the opening sequence for Challenge of the Super Friends claiming that the Legion's members had "banded together from remote galaxies", eleven out of the thirteen are native to Earth; only Brainiac (from Colu), and Sinestro (from Korugar) are extraterrestrials.
 The episode "Super Friends: Rest In Peace" makes a reference to a former unseen member of the Legion of Doom, the only time such a reference has been made. This was Doctor Natas, the inventor of the Noxium crystal that had the power to destroy all of the Super Friends like mimicking Kryptonite for Superman and mimicking a yellow energy for Green Lantern. The Super Friends knew of this crystal and tricked the Legion of Doom into thinking that it had killed all of them using android doubles of the Super Friends while the real ones hid in their space station. They anticipated that the Legion of Doom would throw away the crystal when they no longer needed it. The crystal was retrieved by Apache Chief in a hazmat suit and launched into deep space. It was not explained what happened to Doctor Natas.
 Prior to the first televised appearance of the Legion of Doom, a group called the Super Foes appeared in the first issue of the Super Friends comic book (Nov 1976). Its membership featured Toyman, Penguin, Poison Ivy, Cheetah, Human Flying Fish, and their protégés Toyboy, Chick, Honeysuckle, Kitten and Sardine, respectively, in keeping with the theme of trainees ala Wendy, Marvin and Wonder Dog.

Other Legion episodes
While Challenge of the Super Friends was the series spotlighting the Legion of Doom, they appear in a few Super Friends shorts:
 The Krypton Syndrome: After Superman saves Krypton in the past, he returns to an alternate present. Robin mentions that the Super Friends were defeated by the Legion of Doom.
 Two Gleeks are Deadlier Than One: Though only Giganta and Gorilla Grodd appear, the Legion of Doom is mentioned where the Super Friends investigate rumors that the Legion of Doom are getting back together. Like in "Super Friends: Rest in Peace", the Super Friends used androids to trick Giganta and Gorilla Grodd into thinking they were destroyed.
 The Revenge of Doom (Super Friends short): All 13 members of the Legion of Doom appear after getting back together, but only Lex Luthor, Sinestro and Solomon Grundy have dialogue. In this appearance, they salvaged the Hall of Doom disguised as construction workers with the cover-up that they were going to turn it into a museum. Batman and Robin came upon the "construction workers" and demanded to see their permit which they did having been obtained by the Department of Parks. When there was a mentioning that the Ion Engines were removed by the Super Friends which would've made it the first flying museum, the Dynamic Duo gets suspicious about the construction workers learning about the top secret operation as the lead construction worker claims that the info of that might've been leaked to the news. With the plot exposed, Lex Luthor and the Legion of Doom shed their disguises and capture Batman and Robin. After refurbishing the Legion of Doom and equipping it with new weapons, they have developed a crystallizing ray to immobilize Superman and Wonder Woman. Batman and Robin eventually escape, reverse the effects of the crystallizing ray on Superman and Wonder Woman, and apprehend the Legion of Doom.

Members of the team have solo appearances in later episodes.

Lex Luthor appears in:
 Lex Luthor Strikes Back (The World's Greatest Super Friends) – Using a special camera that would enable him to assume the disguise of everyone, Lex Luthor escapes from prison.
 No Honor Among Thieves Super Friends (Super Friends: The Legendary Super Powers Show) – Lex Luthor collaborates with Darkseid in order to steal the powers of the Super Friends.
 The Case of the Shrinking Super Friends' (Super Friends: The Legendary Super Powers Show) – Lex Luthor uses a shrink ray to shrink the Wonder Twins, Gleek, Robin, Ronnie Raymond, and Professor Martin Stein.
 The Mask of Mystery (Super Friends: The Legendary Super Powers Show) – Lex Luthor steals data that the incompetent superhero wannabe Captain Mystery had tapped from the Hall of Justice's computers in order to trap the Super Friends.
 The Seeds of Doom (The Super Powers Team: Galactic Guardians) – Lex Luthor attacks the city in a giant mechanical spider before he is defeated by the Super Powers Team and Cyborg.

Brainiac appears in:
 Superclones (Super Friends short) - Brainiac clones Aquaman and El Dorado creating supervillain counterparts of them as part of a plot to discredit the Super Friends.
 The Wrath of Brainiac (Super Friends: The Legendary Super Powers Show) – Brainiac collaborates with Darkseid to create android versions of Superman and Wonder Woman. Starting here, Brainiac takes up a more robotic form from this appearance to Brainchild matching his current comic counterpart at the time.
 The Village of Lost Souls (Super Friends: The Legendary Super Powers Show) – Brainiac brainwashes a village of people to serve him and help him rebuild his ship.
 Brainchild (The Super Powers Team: Galactic Guardians) – Brainiac kidnaps Cyborg for an evil "mind-blowing" plan.

Bizarro appears in:
 Revenge of Bizarro (Super Friends short) – Bizarro makes the Super Friends his slaves. He also uses Red Krytonite on Superman causing him to sprout many arms and legs.
 Bazarowurld (Super Friends short) – Bizarro tricks Superman and Black Vulcan into going to Bazarowurld where Black Vulcan is placed in a maze of mirrors and Superman is placed in a Red Kryptonite Mine where he becomes a skinny figure.
 Video Victims (Super Friends short) – Bizarro zaps some of the Super-Friends into a Pac-Man-like video game with him controlling the Pac-Man-like creature.
 The Bizarro Super Powers Team (The Super Powers Team: Galactic Guardians) - Mister Mxyzptlk brings Bizarro #1 to Earth where he uses an invention that makes Bizarro versions of Wonder Woman, Firestorm, and Cyborg. He later accidentally creates a Bizarro version of Mister Mxyzptlk called Mister Kltpzyxm.

Riddler appears in:
 "Around the World in 80 Riddles" (Super Friends short) – Riddler infiltrates the Batcave and sprays Superman, Wonder Woman, Batman, and Robin with Stupid Spray that would decrease their intelligence and had to solve each riddle that would lead to the location of the antidote.

Scarecrow makes an appearance in The Super Powers Team: Galactic Guardians episode "The Fear" which also introducing his real name of Jonathan Crane.

Appearances in comics
Members of the Legion of Doom made some appearances in the Super Friends spin-off comic title based on the TV series:
 A version of the Legion of Doom appeared in Extreme Justice #17–18 (June–July 1996), led by Brainwave Jr., during a time when he had become a villain. The other members were Killer Frost, Houngan, Major Force, the Madmen, and a robot duplicate of Gorilla Grodd.

 The 2006 DC comic miniseries Justice features a version of the Legion of Doom. Series plotter/artist Alex Ross is a passionate Super Friends fan. In addition to Lex Luthor, Bizarro, Black Manta, Brainiac, Captain Cold, Cheetah, Giganta, Gorilla Grodd, Riddler, Scarecrow, Sinestro, Solomon Grundy, and Toyman, this version of the Legion of Doom also counts Black Adam, Metallo, Clayface, Parasite, and Poison Ivy as members. Joker and Doctor Sivana also make appearances. Sivana employs microscopic robots that resemble Mister Mind.
 The Hall of Doom serves as the headquarters for the Injustice League in Justice League of America: Injustice League Unlimited (though, this Hall is located in the Florida swamplands).
 The headquarters of the Justice League in the future of the Sorcerer Kings arc in Superman/Batman is the Hall of Doom.
 An alternate version of the team appeared in the mini-series Flashpoint: Legion of Doom, part of the company-wide Flashpoint event. This iteration of the team consisted of supervillains interred in "Doom Prison", which is based on the Legion headquarters from Super Friends. The membership consisted of Heat Wave, Plastic Man, Sportsmaster, Killer Wasp and Cluemaster.
 A new Legion of Doom led by Superboy-Prime appeared in a Teen Titans storyline that ran from issues #98–100. The roster consisted of Sun Girl, Headcase, Persuader (Elise Kimble), Indigo, Zookeeper, three Superboy clones, and an imposter Inertia.
 The Legion of Doom (minus Toyman, Riddler, Giganta, Captain Cold, and Black Manta) shrunk the Super Friends while appearing as Rainbow Ghosts in "A Super Friend in Need" in the pages of Scooby-Doo! Team-Up.
 In the mini-series Super Powers, Lex Luthor introduces a Legion of Doom featuring Bizarro, Black Manta, Brainiac, Captain Cold, Cheetah, Gorilla Grodd, Pryme, Riddler, Scarecrow, Sinestro, and Starro. Rather than meet in the Hall of Doom, they have a Kryptonite fortress based upon the Fortress of Solitude and set upon the ocean.
 In the miniseries Kingdom Come, the "Gulag" built by Mister Miracle to imprison the younger, more violent heroes bears a strong resemblance to the Hall of Doom. Its warden was Captain Comet, and guarded by Kryptonian-powered robots until a revolt and Captain Marvel destroyed it. 
 The first arc of Scott Snyder and Jim Cheung's Justice League relaunch for DC Rebirth features the Legion of Doom as the main antagonists. The group consists of Lex Luthor, Sinestro, Cheetah, Gorilla Grodd, Brainiac, and Turtle. Former members include Black Manta and Joker, both excommunicated due to their own ulterior motives. Following the advice of The Batman Who Laughs, the Legion had destroyed the Source Wall and uncover the most powerful galactic being of the Sixth Dimension named Perpetua who is the mother of Monitor, Anti-Monitor, and World Forger. They soon take action during the "Year of the Villain" event. To prepare for all-out war with the Justice League, Luthor also recruits various villains to his cause including Bizarro of Earth 29, Black Adam, Black Manta, Black Mask, Captain Cold, Catwoman, Circe and her Injustice League Dark (consisting of Floronic Man, Solomon Grundy, Klarion the Witch Boy, and Papa Midnite), Deathstroke, Harley Quinn, Heat Wave, Lobo, Mr. Freeze, Ocean Master, Oracle III, Ra's al Ghul, Red Hood, Riddler, Talon, and the Terribles of Earth 29 (consisting of Mister Terrible, Change-O-Shape-O, Figment Girl, and Disposable Man). This Legion reappears in "Dark Crisis on Infinite Earths" and is composed of Lex Luthor, Vandal Savage, Punchline, Cheetah, Gorilla Grodd, Black Manta, Sinestro, Scarecrow and the Rogues (Captain Cold, Heat Wave, Golden Glider, Captain Boomerang and Weather Wizard)
 As part of the Wonder Comics imprint, Wonder Twins featured a version of the Legion of Doom. Led by Lex Luthor, the Legion of Doom removed the Scrambler from their ranks after he was incarcerated. After his escape, Scrambler was placed in the Legion's farm league known as the League of Annoyance. Praying Mantis lead the League of Annoyance which also included Aunt Phetamine, Cell Phone Sylvia, Count Drunkula/Baron Nightblood, Malingerer, and Filo Math. While the roster of the Legion was not revealed, the group hosted a villains mixer at the second-best western hotel which included Cheetah, Chronos, Electrocutioner, Giganta, Human Flame, Joker's Daughter, Killer Moth, Kite-Man, Metallo, Mr. Freeze, Parasite, Professor Ivo, Professor Pyg, Prometheus, Queen Bee, Rainbow Raider, Red Flag, Scarecrow, Scavenger, Sonar, Trickster, and Toyman.
 A future version of the Legion of Doom is introduced in "Future State" lead by T.O. Morrow that included Amaz-X, Cobalt Blue, Despera, The Flood, Professor Ivo, Lex Luthor, Screech Owl, and UltraViolet Lantern.
 In The Flash #770-771, Wally West traveled to the Super Friends universe where he inhabited the body of the Reverse-Flash as he was being inducted into the Legion of Doom.

In other media

Television
 The Legion of Doom appears in Legends of the Superheroes, led by Mordru and consisting of Doctor Sivana, the Riddler, Giganta, Sinestro, Weather Wizard, and Solomon Grundy.
 While never directly referred to as such in Justice League Unlimited, with only the DVD box set for the third season explicitly doing so, the Legion of Doom served as inspiration for the show's incarnation of the Secret Society, which is initially led by Gorilla Grodd before Lex Luthor takes over and also includes Bizarro, Devil Ray, the Cheetah, Giganta, Sinestro, Solomon Grundy, and Toyman among their ranks. Series producer Bruce Timm stated he wanted to include the Riddler and Scarecrow as members as a nod to the original Legion, but could not do so due to the "Bat-embargo", which limited the use of Batman-related characters at the time. By the end of the series, Luthor, Bizarro, Cheetah, Giganta, Toyman, and Sinestro, among others, survive an attack by Darkseid before joining forces with the Justice League to foil his invasion of Earth. Ultimately Luthor disappears with Darkseid after finding the Anti-Life Equation while the other survivors are given a "five-minute head start" in return. Of this final appearance, series writer Matt Wayne stated that he consciously tried to round up as many of the original thirteen Legionnaires as he could, citing this English Wikipedia page as one source.
 The Legion of Doom appear in the Batman: The Brave and the Bold episode "Triumvirate of Terror!", consisting of Lex Luthor, the Joker, the Cheetah, Weather Wizard, Felix Faust, and Amazo.
 The Legion of Doom appear in the Robot Chicken DC Comics Special, consisting of the original thirteen Legionnaires, the Joker, Penguin, mailroom worker Glen, Aquaman, Bane, Catwoman, Two-Face, Icicle, Mirror Master, Harley Quinn, Deathstroke, Mr. Freeze, Mister Banjo, Chillblaine, Darkseid, and Robot Chicken original character Humping Robot.
 In the Teen Titans Go! episode "Snuggle Time", the Teen Titans decide to become supervillains and become the "Legion of Doooom", with Starfire becoming Starfire the Terrible, Cyborg becoming The Cyborg, Raven becoming the Demon of Azarath, Robin becoming Dick Gravestone, and Beast Boy becoming Beast Monster.
 The Legion of Doom appear in Robot Chicken DC Comics Special 2: Villains in Paradise, consisting of Lex Luthor, Bizarro, Poison Ivy, Black Manta, the Joker, Penguin, Brainiac, Captain Cold, Scarecrow, Gorilla Grodd, Sinestro, Catwoman, Riddler, Toyman, and Two-Face as prominent members as well as Weather Wizard, Black Adam, Darkseid, Harley Quinn, Mr. Freeze, Professor Zoom, Starro, Killer Croc, and Clayface, who make cameo appearances.
 The Legion of Doom appears in the second season of Legends of Tomorrow, led by Eobard Thawne / Reverse-Flash and consisting of Damien Darhk, Malcolm Merlyn, and a time-displaced Leonard Snart / Captain Cold. Additionally, they are assisted by a brainwashed Rip Hunter and a reluctant Mick Rory / Heat Wave. This version of the group received their name from Legends member Nate Heywood, after a cartoon he enjoyed as a child, and seek the Spear of Destiny to alter their fates. Despite succeeding, they are betrayed by Rory and defeated by the Legends, who allow the Black Flash to erase Thawne from existence before returning the other Legionnaires to the points in time that Thawne pulled them from.
 The Legion of Doom appear in Harley Quinn, led by Lex Luthor and consisting of the Joker, Scarecrow, Cheetah, Bane, Gorilla Grodd, Black Manta, Sinestro, Black Adam, the Reverse-Flash, Toyman, Solomon Grundy, Metallo, Captain Cold, the Parasite, Riddler, Penguin, Two-Face, Man-Bat, Calendar Man, Killer Croc, Killer Frost, Felix Faust, and Livewire. Doctor Psycho was originally a member as well, but was ousted from the group for calling Wonder Woman and Giganta the "C word" on live television, which led to him siding with Harley Quinn, who seeks the join the Legion throughout the first season. This version of the group is based in Gotham and is described as a supportive community of elite supervillains dedicated to making the world a horrible place, having been behind some of the most evil plots in the 21st century. In the episode "The Horse and the Sparrow", Luthor approaches Poison Ivy with an offer to lead the Legion in exchange for eliminating the Joker.

Film
 The Legion of Doom appears in Justice League: Doom, led by Vandal Savage and consisting of the Cheetah, Star Sapphire, Metallo, Bane, Mirror Master, and Ma'alefa'ak. They intend to use a solar flare to end half of humanity, but are foiled by the Justice League.
 The Legion of Doom appears in JLA Adventures: Trapped in Time, consisting of Lex Luthor, Toyman, Cheetah, Captain Cold, Black Manta, Solomon Grundy, Bizarro, and Gorilla Grodd. The Legion travel back in time to eliminate Superman, with the help of Time Trapper.
 The Legion of Doom appears in Lego DC Comics Super Heroes: Justice League: Attack of the Legion of Doom, consisting of Lex Luthor, Cheetah, Captain Cold, Sinestro, Black Manta, and Gorilla Grodd, with the Joker, Penguin, Man-Bat, Giganta, and Deathstroke also appearing as potential recruits who are all rejected for various reasons. This version of the group was formed by Luthor on Darkseid's orders.
 The Legion of Doom appears in Lego DC Super Hero Girls: Super-Villain High, consisting of Lena Luthor and Lashina while Harley Quinn, Catwoman, Poison Ivy, Frost, and Cheetah join temporarily.
 The Legion of Doom appears in Justice League vs. Teen Titans, consisting of Lex Luthor, Toyman, Cheetah, Weather Wizard, and Solomon Grundy.
 The Legion of Doom appears in Teen Titans Go! & DC Super Hero Girls: Mayhem in the Multiverse, consisting of Lex Luthor, film original character Cythonna (voiced by Missi Pyle), the Riddler, Solomon Grundy, Toyman, Giganta, Catwoman, Poison Ivy, Livewire, Star Sapphire, Cheetah, and Harley Quinn.

Video games
 The Hall of Doom appears in DC Universe Online.
 The Legion of Doom appear as playable characters in Lego Batman 3: Beyond Gotham, consisting of Lex Luthor, the Joker, Cheetah, Firefly, Killer Croc, and Solomon Grundy.
 The Legion of Doom appear as playable characters in Lego DC Super-Villains, consisting of Lex Luthor, Mercy Graves, the Rookie (the player's customizable character), Cheetah, Solomon Grundy, the Joker, Harley Quinn, Clayface, Riddler, Scarecrow, Catwoman, Two-Face, Penguin, the Rogues, Malcolm Merlyn, Reverse-Flash, Killer Frost, Deadshot, Poison Ivy, Livewire, Gorilla Grodd, Sinestro, Black Adam, Deathstroke, Metallo, Firefly, Clock King, Kite Man, Polka-Dot Man, Bronze Tiger, Doctor Poison, Calendar Man, an OMAC Operative, Psycho-Pirate, and Condiment King.

Miscellaneous
 The Legion of Doom appears in The Aquaman & Friends Action Hour as bankrupt enemies of Aquaman.
 The Legion of Doom appears in a Six Flags New England live show written by Brandon T. Snider, consisting of Lex Luthor, the Joker, the Riddler, the Cheetah, Captain Cold, and Sinestro.
 The Legion of Doom appears in the opening sequence for DC Super Friends: The Joker's Playhouse.

Cultural references

 In the mid to late 1990s, the Philadelphia Flyers forward line of John LeClair, Eric Lindros, and Mikael Renberg was nicknamed the Legion of Doom.
 Professional wrestling manager Paul Ellering named his wrestling stable The Legion of Doom after the supervillain group, eventually using the name to refer to his chief – and later sole – protégés, the tag team of The Road Warriors. When the Road Warriors arrived in the World Wrestling Federation in 1990, they changed their team name to The Legion of Doom.
 Two Cartoon Network bumpers featured the Legion of Doom. One had The Powerpuff Girls saving Aquaman and Wonder Woman from the Legion's clutches. The other featured the membership annoying Luthor with petty demands.
 In the season six episode of Buffy the Vampire Slayer, "Normal Again", Jonathan asks Andrew, "Did you even read Legion of Doom?".
 An episode of The Drew Carey Show featured Drew and his friends getting in trouble being a "gang". Drew gets sent to a counseling session for gangbangers and enters the room to see a group of imposing bikers and gang members sitting around a large table. He quips "the reason I've called you all here is to destroy Superman" as Lex Luthor would do when leading a Legion meeting.
 In the Family Guy episode "It Takes a Village Idiot, and I Married One", Lois, when trying to get money from the town to purify Lake Quahog during her time as the Mayor of Quahog, convinced the people in a press conference that the money would help to stop terrorists. One of these claims is that Adolf Hitler is conspiring with the Legion of Doom to assassinate Jesus while using Lake Quahog to conceal their base. The scene then jumps to the Hall of Doom where Lex Luthor shouts "How did she discover our plan?!". Solomon Grundy quotes "Me Solomon Grundy kind of dropped the ball on that one". Almost all of the original Legion is portrayed except for the Riddler. In "Something, Something, Something Dark Side" (which is a parody version of Star Wars Episode V: The Empire Strikes Back), there is a reference to "The Legion of Doom" when the Hall of Doom begins to rise out of the swamp on Dagobah shortly after Luke Skywalker (portrayed by Family Guy character Chris Griffin) has landed. An announcer bearing resemblance to the narrative voice on Super Friends begins by saying "Meanwhile, at the Legion of Doom..." only to be cut off by Chris (playing Luke Skywalker) who says "Not now!". The narration then quickly says "OK" as the apparent Hall of Doom sinks back beneath the water in the swamp.
 In the Harvey Birdman, Attorney at Law episode "Peanut Puberty", the headquarters for the Legion of Doom was used for a club called the "Legion of Dance".
 The first episode of Season 3 of Duck Dodgers titled "Till Doom Do Us Part" featured the Legion of Duck Doom, led by Agent Roboto and was composed of various villains from the earlier seasons made up of Crusher, Fudd, a Catapoid, Count Muerte, New Cadet, Nasty Canasta, Commandante Hilgalgo, Baby-Faced Moonbeam, Long John Silver the 23rd, K'chutha Sa'am, and Tasmanian Warrior. A new villain that is part of the Legion of Duck Doom named Black Eel (a parody of Black Manta) makes his first appearance in this episode.
 In the Aqua Teen Hunger Force episode "The Last One", the Mooninites tried to organize a league of every single villain that was from Season 1 to 3. Among its members are the Mooninites, Rabbot, Mothmonsterman, Happy Time Harry, Cybernetic Ghost of Christmas Past from the Future, Travis of the Cosmos, Randy the Astonishing, the Brownie Monsters, Romulox, MC Pee Pants's worm, the Trees, Frat Aliens, Oog, Dumbassahedratron, Ol'Drippy, and Major Shake. However, almost all of them got foolishly killed or asked to leave leaving only a small force led by the Mooninites. Afterwards, the Rabbot called the team "Monday Tuesday Wednesday".
 In the Krypto the Superdog episode "Mechanikalamity", the Intergalactic Villains Club that Mechanicat is a part of is a spoof of the Legion of Doom and has a base that is similar to the Hall of Doom. Due to Mechanicat's repeated failure to defeat Krypto, he has been unable to get elected as leader with the recent election having the members voting for Glorg to be the leader of the Intergalactic Villains Club.
 The music video for the song "P.I.M.P." by rappers 50 Cent, Snoop Dogg, Lloyd Banks and Young Buck features 50 Cent seeking the join the "P.I.M.P. Legion of Doom" who are led by Snoop Dogg. The P.I.M.P Legion of Doom gathers around a round table and the pros and cons of 50 Cent joining their group. Despite not having a Cadillac or a perm, 50 Cent becomes a members by pleasing its members upon showing them his "magic stick".
 In Johnny Test, the Evil Johnny Stopping Force Five have a secret base in a swamp that closely resembles the Legion of Doom's secret headquarters.
 The song "Trap or Die" by rap artists Young Jeezy and Bun B contains the lyric "I've got my own Super Friends in a Legion of Doom", referencing the DC characters.
 In the early to mid 2010s, the Seattle Seahawks defense was nicknamed the Legion of Boom. Major players consisted of Richard Sherman, Kam Chancellor and Earl Thomas. This was a play on the villain group's name.
 In the New Orleans region of CLUBWAKA (World Adult Kickball Association), there is a team named Legion of Doom. Their colors are orange & black and they use a logo that incorporates the Hall of Doom in the imagery. Each member of the team chooses a villain from the DC roster, and one game a season they dress as their villainous alter egos while challenging their opponents to dress in costumes as DC heroes. They are currently in their 12th season and have had over 50 different villains represented.
 President Donald Trump's ordered assassination of Qasem Soleimani outside of Baghdad International Airport resulted in Fox News reporting Trump had taken out "the legion of doom".

References

Villains in animated television series
Comic book terrorist organizations
DC Comics supervillain teams
Super Friends characters